Mauricio Magdaleno Cardona (13 May 1906 – 30 June 1986), better known as Mauricio Magdaleno, was a Mexican screenwriter and occasional director of the Golden Age of Mexican cinema. He was nominated for six Ariel Awards and won for his second nomination for Río Escondido in 1949. Magdaleno was also a well-known journalist, writer, and politician.

Selected filmography
 Wild Flower (1943)
 Michael Strogoff (1944)
 Tragic Wedding (1946)
 Everybody's Woman (1946)
 Gran Casino (1947)
 The Unloved Woman (1949)
 Coquette (1949)
 Salón México (1949)
 Love for Love (1950)
 History of a Heart (1951)
 Women's Prison (1951)
 Maria Islands (1951)
 The White Rose (1954)
 The Rapture (1954)

References

External links 
 

1906 births
1986 deaths
Mexican male screenwriters
Mexican film directors
Mexican journalists
Male journalists
Mexican male writers
Writers from Zacatecas
Politicians from Zacatecas
20th-century Mexican politicians
20th-century Mexican screenwriters
20th-century Mexican male writers
20th-century journalists